Barry Morley Joseph Callaghan  (born July 5, 1937) is a Canadian author, poet and anthologist. He is currently the editor-in-chief of Exile Quarterly. 
Born in Toronto, Ontario, he is the son of late Canadian novelist and short story writer, Morley Callaghan. He is a graduate of the University of Toronto.

He won the 2019 ReLit Award for short fiction for his collection All the Lonely People.
In 2006 Priscita Uppal edited Barry Callaghan: Essays on His Works  a volume in the Guernica Editions 'Essential Writers Series' under general editor Joseph Pivato.

Selected bibliography
 The Hogg Poems and Drawings – 1978
 As Close as We Came – 1982
 The Black Queen Stories – 1982
 The Way the Angel Spreads Her Wings – 1989
 Stone Blind Love – 1989
 Canadian Travellers in Italy – 1989 (editor)
 Exile: The First Fifteen Years – 1992 (editor)
 Lords of Winter and of Love: A Book of Canadian Love Poems in English and French – 1993]
 'When Things Get Worse – 1993
 A Kiss is Still a Kiss – 1995
 This Ain't No Healing Town: Toronto Stories – 1996 (editor)
 Barrelhouse Kings – 1998
 We Wasn't Pals: Canadian Poetry and Prose of the First World War – 2001 (edited with Bruce Meyer)
 Young Bloods: Stories from Exile 1972–2001 – 2001 (editor)
 Between Trains – 2007
 Beside Still Waters – 2009
 All the Lonely People: Collected Stories - 2018

References

External links
Barry Callaghan archives at the Clara Thomas Archives and Special Collections, York University Libraries, Toronto, Ontario
 Barry Callaghan's bio and list of books

1937 births
Living people
Canadian male novelists
Canadian male poets
University of Toronto alumni
Harbourfront Festival Prize winners
Journalists from Toronto
Members of the Order of Canada
Writers from Toronto
Canadian anthologists
Canadian male non-fiction writers
20th-century Canadian novelists
20th-century Canadian male writers
21st-century Canadian novelists
21st-century Canadian male writers
20th-century Canadian poets
21st-century Canadian poets